The 1st Guards Brigade was an infantry brigade of the British Army, formed in the First World War. It was formed in August 1915 by the redesignation of the 4th (Guards) Brigade on its transfer from the 2nd Division to the Guards Division. It served with the Guards Division on the Western Front for the rest of the war.

History

4th (Guards) Brigade
The 4th Brigade was an infantry brigade of the British Army with a history that stretched back to the Napoleonic Wars. At the outbreak of World War I in August 1914, the 4th Brigade was a regular army formation stationed in London District and assigned to the 2nd Division. It was designated as 4th (Guards) Brigade as it commanded four battalions of Foot Guards.

The brigade was among the first British formations to be sent overseas as part of the British Expeditionary Force (BEF), crossing to France between 11 and 16 August 1914. It served on the Western Front in 1914 and 1915 taking part in the Battle of Mons (23 and 24 August 1914), the First Battle of the Marne (69 September), the First Battle of the Aisne (1320 September), the First Battle of Ypres (19 October30 November), and the Battle of Festubert (1520 May 1915).

Formation
On 19 August 1915, the brigade was transferred complete to the newly formed Guards Division and redesignated as 1st Guards Brigade the next day. It remained with the division for the rest of the war, serving exclusively on the Western Front.

War service
In September 1915, the brigade took part in the Battle of Loos (26 September8 October) and Hohenzollern Redoubt (1819 October). In 1916, it fought in the later stages of the Battle of the Somme, in particular the Battle of Flers–Courcelette (1516 and 2022 September), the Battle of Morval (2528 September), and the Capture of Lesboeufs (25 September). In 1917, it saw action in the Battle of Passchendaele including the Battle of Pilckem Ridge (31 July2 August), the Battle of Poelcappelle (9 October), and the First Battle of Passchendaele (12 October). It then took part in the Battle of Cambrai (24 November3 December).

In February 1918, British divisions on the Western Front were reduced from a 12-battalion to a 9-battalion basis (brigades from four to three battalions). As a result, the 4th Guards Brigade was formed on 8 February 1918 by taking a battalion from each of the brigades of the Guards Division and the 1st Guards Brigade lost the 3rd Battalion, Coldstream Guards.

1918 saw the return of the war of movement. It had to withstand the German Army's Spring Offensive in the First Battles of the Somme (125 March) then switched over to counter-attack in the Second Battles of the Somme (2123 August), the Second Battle of Arras (26 August3 September), the Battles of the Hindenburg Line (12 September12 October), and in the Final Advance in Picardy including the battles of the Selle and of the Sambre. Its final action was the Capture of Maubeuge on 9 November.

Post-war
After the signing of the Armistice of 11 November 1918, the brigade was at Assevent, north-east of Maubeuge, and on 17 November it regained 3rd Battalion, Coldstream Guards from the disbanding 4th Guards Brigade. The next day it began the march on Germany and crossed the frontier on 11 December. By 19 December it had reached the Cologne area. Battalions started returning to England on 20 February 1919 and the last units had completed the move by 29 April.

Order of battle
The following units served in the brigade:
 2nd Battalion, Grenadier Guards
 2nd Battalion, Coldstream Guards
 3rd Battalion, Coldstream Guards (joined the 4th Guards Brigade on 8 February 1918, returned on 17 November 1918)
 1st Battalion, Irish Guards
 1st Guards Brigade Machine Gun Company (formed 1–19 September 1915; joined the 4th Battalion, Machine Gun Guards on 1 March 1918)
 1st Guards Trench Mortar Battery (formed 2–18 May 1916)

Commanders
The brigade had the following commanders:

See also

Notes

References

Bibliography

External links
 

Infantry brigades of the British Army in World War I
Guards Division (United Kingdom)
Military units and formations established in 1915
Military units and formations disestablished in 1918